CJGO-FM is a Canadian radio station, which broadcasts at 102.1 FM in La Sarre, Quebec. Owned and operated by Arsenal Media, the station airs an active rock format branded as Capitale Rock.

CJGO also has a rebroadcaster in Rouyn-Noranda, CHGO-FM-1, 95.7 FM; the repeater originally rebroadcast sister station CHGO-FM in Val-d'Or until August 2010, when it switched to CJGO. Although the station is licensed to La Sarre and the transmitter in Rouyn-Noranda is legally a rebroadcaster, the station's actual studios are located in Rouyn-Noranda.

The station was originally an AM station, CKLS, converting to 102.1 FM in 1997.

References

External links
 Capitale Rock
 
 

Radio stations established in 1950
Jgo
Jgo
Jgo